The 1930 Kansas State Wildcats football team represented the Kansas State Agricultural College (now known as Kansas State University) as a member the Big Six Conference during the 1930 college football season. Led by third-year head coach Bo McMillin, the Wildcats compiled and overall record of 5–3 overall with a mark of 3–2 in conference play, placing third.

Schedule

References

Kansas State
Kansas State Wildcats football seasons
Kansas State Wildcats football